Justice Duncan or Judge Duncan, may refer to:

Allyson Kay Duncan (born 1951), U.S. Circuit Judge
Charles T. Duncan (1838–1915), Virginia state judge
John Alton Duncan (1932–2007), Manitoba Superior Court Judge
Kyle Duncan (judge) (born 1972), U.S. Circuit Judge
Laurence Ilsley Duncan (20th century), associate justice of the New Hampshire Supreme Court
Rebecca Duncan (born 1971), associate justice of the Oregon Supreme Court
Robert Morton Duncan (1927–2012), associate justice of the Ohio Supreme Court
Warren W. Duncan (1857–1938), associate justice of the Illinois Supreme Court

See also
Benjamin Faneuil Dunkin, chief justice of the South Carolina Supreme Court
Judge Duncan (disambiguation)